Braco may refer to:

Places 
 Braco, Perth and Kinross, a village in Scotland
 Braco Airfield, an airstrip in Jamaica

People 
 Braco (faith healer) (born 1967), self-styled healer from Croatia
 Baron Braco, a title in the Peerage of Ireland
 Braco Dimitrijević (born 1948), Paris-based Bosnian and Yugoslavian artist
 Celestino Aós Braco (born 1945), Spanish-born prelate of the Catholic Church
 Lorraine Braco (born 1954), American film and television actress
 Vincent Braco (1835-1889), Italian prelate of the Catholic Church

See also 
 Bracco (disambiguation)
 Bracho (disambiguation)
 Brako (disambiguation)